Musson Nunatak is a pyramidal nunatak standing 10 nautical miles (18 km) south of Mount Jackson, at the east margin of the Dyer Plateau of Palmer Land. Mapped by United States Geological Survey (USGS) in 1974. Named by Advisory Committee on Antarctic Names (US-ACAN) for John M. Musson, PH2, U.S. Navy, photographer and member of the cartographic aerial mapping crew in LC-130 aircraft of Squadron VXE-6, 1968–69.

Nunataks of Palmer Land